was an ace fighter pilot in the Imperial Japanese Navy during World War II.  Participating in many of the Pacific War battles and campaigns as a member of several units, Sasakibara was officially credited with destroying 12 enemy aircraft.  He was seriously injured while supporting the Ke operation during the Guadalcanal Campaign, but survived after a lengthy stay in the hospital.  He returned to Japan in June 1945 and survived the war.

References

1921 births
2005 deaths
Japanese naval aviators
Japanese World War II flying aces
Military personnel from Aomori Prefecture
Imperial Japanese Navy officers